Deflection or deflexion may refer to:

Board games
 Deflection (chess), a tactic that forces an opposing chess piece to leave a square
 Khet (game), formerly Deflexion, an Egyptian-themed chess-like game using lasers

Mechanics
 Deflection (ballistics), shooting ahead of a moving target so that the target and projectile will collide
 Deflection (engineering), the displacement of a structural element under load
 Deflection (physics), the event where an object collides and bounces against a plane surface

Social sciences
 Deflexion (linguistics), the degeneration of a language's inflectional system over time
 Deflection (psychology), a defence mechanism

Technologies
 Deflection routing, a routing strategy for networks to reduce the need of buffering packets
 Deflection yoke, a kind of magnetic lens used in cathode ray tubes
 Electrostatic deflection, a technique for modifying the path of charged particles by the use of an electric field
 Deflect.ca, a DDoS mitigation and website security service

See also 
 
 
 Deflector (disambiguation)